Square Pegs (Traditional Chinese: 戇夫成龍) was a Hong Kong television series 2003.  The program's title is an abbreviated reference to the English idiomatic phrase "square peg in a round hole."

The series was the runaway success of 2003, commanding a peak viewership of 46 points, approximately 3.5 million or roughly half of Hong Kong's population during the last week of its broadcast, and breaking TVB's ten-year ratings record. It also went on to win four awards for its two lead actors in the TVB 36th Anniversary Awards, and made both Roger Kwok and Jessica Hsuan household names in the territory.

Synopsis
Choi Fong (Jessica Hsuan) is the eldest daughter of the Ling family that includes her oft-absent father, stepmother and stepsister Choi Dip (Leila Tong). Like Cinderella, she undertakes all the housework, does the grocery shopping, cooks for the family, and prevents her father's antique collection from falling prey to her stepmother's gambling appetite.

One day, Mrs. Ling's vice finally catches up with her and to pay a particular debt, Choi Dip is consigned to marry the village idiot Ding Seung Wong or Ah Wong (Roger Kwok), who has about the same intelligence as an eight-year-old child. Unwilling to commit her real daughter to a life of misery, Mrs. Ling arranges a double wedding and switches the brides so that Choi Fong ends up marrying Ah Wong, while Choi Dip marries Bao Gai Zong (Raymond Cho), the scion of the wealthy Bao family. And so begins Choi Fong's merry schemes to escape from her marriage with Ah Wong who, to her consternation, takes an immediate liking to her and clings to her like sticky biscuit dough.

After several failed attempts evading her fate, Choi Fong gradually resigns herself to play Ah Wong's "lou por jai" or "little wife". One day, a strange girl Yeung Pui Kwan (Winnie Yeung) arrives in town and claims Ah Wong for her fiancé. Choi Fong soon learns that Ah Wong was actually a bright young man and the real heir of the Bao family who inexplicably disappeared two years ago, only to reappear with an IQ of an eight-year-old.

Hoping to return Ah Wong to his rightful babysitter as soon as possible, Choi Fong agrees to help Pui Kwan get to the root of the mystery. So the girls embark on a campaign to expose the bogus Bao Gai Zong, reinstate Ah Wong as the rightful heir, and help him regain his memory. But just as Ah Wong begins to show signs of recovery, Choi Fong realises to her dismay that she has fallen for him...

Cast

Main cast

Other cast

Awards and nominations
 Roger Kwok won his first "Best Actor in a Leading Role" Award for his role Ding Sheung Wong, at the 36th TVB Anniversary Awards in 2003.

External links
TVB.com Square Pegs - Official Website 

TVB dramas
2002 Hong Kong television series debuts
2003 Hong Kong television series endings